Reginald Emanuel Dos Remédios, also spelled Reginaldo (12 December 1922 – 22 September 2005) was a Hong Kong sports shooter. He competed at the 1964 Summer Olympics and the 1976 Summer Olympics. He also competed at the 1962, 1966 and 1970 Asian Games.

References

1922 births
2005 deaths
Hong Kong male sport shooters
Commonwealth Games competitors for Hong Kong
Shooters at the 1974 British Commonwealth Games
Olympic shooters of Hong Kong
Shooters at the 1964 Summer Olympics
Shooters at the 1976 Summer Olympics
Place of birth missing
Shooters at the 1962 Asian Games
Shooters at the 1966 Asian Games
Shooters at the 1970 Asian Games
Asian Games competitors for Hong Kong